Bösendorfer (L. Bösendorfer Klavierfabrik GmbH) is an Austrian  piano manufacturer and, since 2008, a wholly owned subsidiary of Yamaha Corporation. Bösendorfer is unusual in that it produces 97- and 92-key models in addition to instruments with standard 88-key keyboards.

Along with C. Bechstein, Blüthner and Steinway & Sons, Bösendorfer is frequently referred to as one of the "Big Four" piano manufacturers.

History

Bösendorfer, one of the oldest piano manufacturers, was established in 1828 by Ignaz Bösendorfer.  It has a history of producing highly respected instruments.

In 1830, it was granted the status of official piano maker to the Emperor of Austria.

Ignaz's son Ludwig Bösendorfer (1835–1919) assumed control in 1859, operating from new premises from 1860.

Between 1872 and its closure in 1913, the associated Bösendorfer-Saal was one of the premier concert halls of Vienna.

In 1909, Carl Hutterstrasser purchased the company and was succeeded by his sons Alexander and Wolfgang in 1931.

In 1966, the Jasper Corporation (later renamed Kimball International), parent company of Kimball Pianos, assumed control of Bösendorfer.

In 2001 Bösendorfer returned to Austrian hands, when the BAWAG PSK Gruppe purchased it.

On 21 December 2007 BAWAG signed an agreement to sell 100% of Bösendorfer to Yamaha Corporation.

Bösendorfer continues to make handcrafted pianos in the same Vienna factory. Almost 300 of these premium pianos are made each year.

Characteristics 

Bösendorfer pioneered the extension of the typical 88-key keyboard, creating the Imperial Grand (Model 290), which has 97 keys (eight octaves). Ferruccio Busoni initially ordered this innovation in 1909 as part of a custom piano, as he wanted to transcribe an organ piece that extended to the C below the standard keyboard. This innovation worked so well that this piano was added to regular product offerings and quickly became one of the world's most sought-after concert grands. Because of the 290's success, the extra strings were added to Bösendorfer's other line of instruments such as the 225 model, which has 92 keys. The extra keys, at the bass end of the keyboard, were originally hidden beneath a hinged panel mounted between the piano's conventional low A and the left-hand end-cheek to prevent their being struck accidentally during normal play; more recent models have omitted this device and simply have the upper surface of the extra natural keys finished in matte black instead of white to differentiate them from the standard 88.

The Bösendorfer sound is usually described as darker or richer than the purer but less full-bodied sound of other pianos, such as Steinway & Sons or Yamaha. On the Imperial Grand, this characteristic tonal quality in part derives from the inclusion of nine additional bass notes below bottom A. These extra keys were originally added so that pianists could play Busoni's transcriptions of J. S. Bach's organ works, which required the 32′ bass pipes (usually played on the pedal organ). As very little other music makes direct use of the extra strings, they usually contribute to the piano's sonic character not through being played directly but via sympathetic resonance, when other strings in the piano are struck, contributing additional body to the tone. Moreover, the bass notes of the Bösendorfer, including the extra bass keys, are very powerful, adding volume in demanding literature.

Bösendorfer Kuhn pianos come with 10 Swarovski leaded-glass crystals inserted along the steel structure. The million-dollar Kuhn has 72 crystals installed under the strings.

The rim of a Bösendorfer grand piano is built quite differently from that of all other grands. Instead of veneers bent around a form, the rim is made in solid sections of spruce and jointed together. Spruce is better at transmitting sound than reflecting it. This is perhaps why Bösendorfers tend to have a more delicate treble and a bass that features the fundamental tone more than the higher harmonics. There are also two other features of Bösendorfers that are shared with only a few other piano brands: one is a removable capo d'astro bar in the treble, which facilitates rebuilding of the instrument and, Bösendorfer says, provides greater acoustic separation from the plate, decreasing tonal absorption; the other is single-stringing, providing each string its own individual hitch pin on the plate instead of connecting it to a neighbouring string. This design may slightly improve tuning stability and is an advantage in case of string breakage.

The latest development in the Bösendorfer range is the CEUS digital grand piano reproducing system, which incorporates a computer-controlled mechanism that records a performance on a digital storage medium (magnetic disk or memory chips) and plays it back. The requisite equipment can be fitted to most Bösendorfer pianos to allow the direct recording of pieces while capturing all the keyboard velocity data as a .boe file. Bösendorfer uses a proprietary format to record key and pedal movements as a digital file.

Models

Bösendorfer makes eight models of grand piano from 155 cm to 290 cm in length (5'1" to 9'6") and two vertical pianos,120 cm and 130 cm in height (47" and 51"). The Imperial Grand is one of the world's largest pianos.
Each numerical Bösendorfer model directly corresponds to its length in centimeters. For example, a Model 170 is 170 centimeters long (approximately 5'7"). The following tables describes the current Bösendorfer models:

Grand pianos 
Current Grand Piano Models

Upright pianos 
Current Upright Piano Models

Conservatory Series
To appeal to a wider market, Bösendorfer designed the Conservatory Series for colleges and universities that could not afford Bösendorfer's standard black-model pianos. The production of the two CS Series pianos spends less time in "non-critical areas", cutting down costs of production and purchase, making them more affordable than standard models. The cases and frames are of satin finish, rather than polished and, initially, the pianos were loop-strung rather than single-strung, but those practices have since been abandoned.

Special and Limited editions
Bösendorfer has produced a number of specially designed pianos named after famous composers such as Franz Schubert, Frédéric Chopin and Franz Liszt, as well as pianos designed for special occasions, such as Bösendorfer's 170th and 175th anniversaries.

SE reproducing piano
Under the ownership of Kimball, Bösendorfer built and sold a small number of 290SE automatic reproducing pianos.  The 'SE' designation was for Stahnke Engineering, whose founder, Wayne Stahnke, invented the mechanism. The 290 was fitted with electronics and mechanics to record on magnetic tape and playback through electro-mechanical actuation of the piano. After the release of the Microsoft Windows v3.1 operating system, the 290SE could be attached to a PC computer for recording, editing and playback. The 290SE system was the first commercially available computer-controlled "player piano" capable of accurately reproducing both the notes and intensity of a performer's playing.  This system was not further developed or patented due to its high cost.  Competitors soon introduced patented reproducing piano technologies such as the Yamaha Disklavier in 1982.

Thirty seven SE models were produced between 1984 and 1986, including the 225SE, the 275SE, and the 290SE Imperial model pianos. In the 290 range, this included some 290 to 290SE conversions, while one third of the production were 290SEs that sold for $90,000.

The research that went into the 290SE later laid the foundation for the CEUS computerized reproducing piano system.

Designer models
Bösendorfer produces a limited number of Artisan Models annually, each available for order only during the calendar year in which it was developed. An example of a designer model is the Bösendorfer Swarovski Crystal Grand piano. Three of these special pianos were produced in 2003 in honour of Bösendorfer's 175th anniversary. Each piano's case is encrusted with 8000 crystals and layers of gold.

Three notable architects who have designed Bösendorfer piano models are Theophil Freiherr von Hansen (1866), Josef Hoffmann (1909) and Hans Hollein (1990). There were only two Hans Hollein 225 models produced in 1990; one can be found in the lounge of the Grand Bohemian Hotel in Orlando, Florida.

Bösendorfer artists

Among the earliest artists to be associated with Bösendorfer was Franz Liszt, who at least once opined that Bösendorfer and Bechstein pianos were the only instruments capable of withstanding his tremendously powerful playing, although he purchased and officially endorsed Steinway & Sons pianos. The renowned twentieth-century American composer–conductor Leonard Bernstein has also performed on a Bösendorfer. Another great pianist who championed Bösendorfer pianos was Wilhelm Backhaus.

In his memoirs, Arthur Rubinstein recounts having insisted on a Bechstein instead of the hall's Bösendorfer before a recital in Austria.  After the performance, the then-head of the Bösendorfer company came backstage to meet this young artist who refused to play a piano highly cherished by his Russian namesake, Anton Rubinstein; Rubinstein claims he thereafter always sought out Bösendorfers when in Austria. Both Rubinsteins were Steinway & Sons artists and played these pianos when in the United States.

In the late 1970s, following a concert performed in Vienna, jazz pianist Oscar Peterson turned to his impresario, Norman Granz, with the words: "Dammit, Norman, where does this box go? I also gotta have such a thing!" Such was his reaction to playing a Bösendorfer 290. Musician/comedian Victor Borge also played Bösendorfer pianos.

More recent examples of notable artists who have played the Bösendorfer include Russian pianist Sviatoslav Richter (who in later years chose to promote Yamaha claiming it had a preferable pianissimo sound and control, according to his own interview); Hungarian pianist András Schiff; Austrian pianist Alfred Brendel; Italian pianist Arturo Benedetti Michelangeli; American free jazz pianist Cecil Taylor and American singer-songwriter Tori Amos; German pianist Wolfgang Rübsam; Austrian pianists Friedrich Gulda, Walter Klien and Paul Badura-Skoda; British pianists Leon McCawley and Mark Gasser as well as the Irish pianist John O'Conor. Ukrainian pianist Valentina Lisitsa has recorded DVDs of Chopin and Schubert-Liszt on a 1925 model Bösendorfer, and has released a new video set of a recital using the 97-key Bösendorfer Imperial.

Minimalist composer Charlemagne Palestine chose a nine-foot Bösendorfer as the vehicle on which to perform his 1974 composition Strumming Music. Released as his first compact disc in 1991, it features in excess of 45 minutes of Palestine forcefully playing two notes in rapid alternation, slowly expanding into clusters, with the sustain pedal depressed throughout. As the music swells (and the piano gradually detunes), the harmonics build and the listener can hear a variety of timbres rarely produced by the piano.

Jazz pianist Keith Jarrett performed the solo improvisations (his Köln Concert) at the Cologne Opera House in Cologne, Germany, on 24 January 1975 on a Bösendorfer and became a Steinway & Sons artist in 1981.

The jazz singers/pianists Nina Simone and Shirley Horn performed on Bösendorfers many times throughout their careers.

In a recent interview for Broadway.com, Academy Award-winning composer Stephen Schwartz stated that he purchased a Bösendorfer after the initial success of his musical Wicked.

Recordings
Bösendorfer pianos have appeared on numerous records. Some examples are:

Classical
Aldo Ciccolini recorded his second traversal of the piano music of Erik Satie on a Bösendorfer; his first traversal was on a Steinway. Both are included in French EMI set 50999685824 2 5, offering record listeners an unusual opportunity for direct comparison of the two instruments.
Peter Hill recorded Havergal Brian's complete piano music on a Bösendorfer Imperial at the Northern College of Music for Cameo Classics. John Ogdon highly praised the recordings in his review for Tempo.
Gerhard Oppitz in 1989 recorded a complete traversal of the solo piano music of Johannes Brahms on an Imperial Grand.
Awadagin Pratt more recently recorded Mussorgsky's Pictures at an Exhibition, his own transcription of Bach's Passacaglia and Fugue in C minor, BWV 582, and Brahms's Variations and Fugue on a Theme by Handel on an Imperial Grand.
 Sviatoslav Richter recorded Bach's Well-Tempered Clavier on a Bösendorfer at Salzburg in two settings of 1972 and 1973.
 Carol Rosenberger recorded music of Liszt, Griffes, Ravel, and Debussy and Beethoven's Appassionata and op. 111 sonatas on an Imperial Concert Grand.
Moritz Rosenthal played a Bösendorfer for his celebrated series of recordings for HMV.
Terry Riley's 1986 minimalist piano piece written in Just intonation, The Harp of New Albion, was recorded on a Bösendorfer Imperial grand piano, specially tuned for Riley himself.
Robert Silverman committed a complete Beethoven sonata cycle to computer hard drive on a Bösendorfer 290SE reproducing piano. John Atkinson of Stereophile magazine then recorded a similar piano at the Maestro Foundation recital hall in Santa Monica, California replaying the files; the resulting CDs were issued as a 10-disc set.
Robert Ekelund – Two albums of piano pieces performed by economist and pianist Robert Ekelund, performed on the Murray N. and JoAnn B. Rothbard Bösendorfer Imperial Concert Grand Piano in the Mises Institute's Conservatory. Ekelund also performed Brahms Rhapsody Op. 79, No. 2; J.S. Bach, Gigue, French Suite No. 5 (G-major).
Valentina Lisitsa Chopin's 24 Études D.V.D. track. Op. 10 and Op. 25 Études.
Igor Stravinsky's Le Sacre du Printemps, The Firebird and Petrushka played by Dag Achatz and Roland Pöntinen on BIS Records was played on a Bosendorfer Model 275
Kimiko Douglass-Ishizaka has recorded J. S. Bach's Goldberg Variations for public domain release on the Internet by the Open Goldberg Variations project, an initiative sponsored in part by Bösendorfer. She played a C290 Imperial fitted with the CEUS system. Accompanying the recording—offered in MP3, FLAC, and 24 bit 44 K WAV formats—is a freshly made copy of the full score. Ishizaka also recorded Bach's The Well-Tempered Clavier on a Bösendorfer 280. 

Costantino Catena has recorded on new Bösendorfer VC280 the CD "Dedications—Schumann-Liszt / Costantino Catena plays the new Bösendorfer 280VC" for Camerata Tokyo 
Zoltán Kocsis recorded on Bösendorfer, together with conductor Ivan Fischer and the Budapest Festival Orchestra, the complete work for piano and orchestra by Bela Bartok for Philips.

Popular
Victor Borge was known for using Bösendorfer pianos during many of his shows.
Peter Bence used a Bösendorfer 290 Imperial to record a cover of Toto's Africa.
Richard Clayderman used a Bösendorfer for his recordings.
Elvis Costello in his album Punch the Clock.
Oscar Peterson used Bösendorfer almost exclusively from 1977 until 2006.
Brian May and Freddie Mercury of the band Queen employed the Bösendorfer in the song Flash.
Peter Gabriel in his album Up. 
Rick Wright played a Bösendorfer grand piano on "Shine On You Crazy Diamond (Part 8)" from the Pink Floyd album, Wish You Were Here.
Roger Waters chose a Bösendorfer grand piano "9-foot-six, please" as his luxury item on Desert Island Discs, though only after he was denied a satellite link to watch Arsenal Football Club matches.
Rick Astley playing a Bösendorfer grand piano in Cry for Help videoclip.
Bradley Joseph in his album Rapture.
Giovanni Allevi in his album 13 Dita.
According to composer Jim Steinman, Roy Bittan played a Bösendorfer on the Meat Loaf album Bat Out of Hell in 1977, which was a deviation from Steinman's preference for Yamaha pianos.
Dr. Evil plays a Bösendorfer in the Austin Powers movies ('böse' means evil in German).
The Greek composer Vangelis used a Bösendorfer grand piano on his albums Heaven and Hell (1975) and China (1979).
Singer/songwriter Tori Amos has recorded and toured exclusively with Bösendorfers since 1993.
Keith Jarrett in The Köln Concert.
Matthew Bellamy of the rock band Muse has recently started using a Bösendorfer.
The electronic dance music band Above & Beyond (band) used Paavo Siljamäki's Bösendorfer grand piano on their song "Small Moments" (2012).
Pete Townshend of the rock band The Who is seen playing a large Bösendorfer on the song, "Who Are You", filmed during a recording at Ramport Studios and featured in the movie, The Kids are Alright.

In popular culture 
 A Bösendorfer was featured in the 2017 Academy Award–nominated film Call Me by Your Name.
 A Bösendorfer, with artwork by Japanese artist Takashi Murakami, is seen in the video for Drake's 2020 song "Toosie Slide".
 Bösendorfer samples are used extensively in Yamaha's flagship Clavinova lineup.
 A Bösendorfer was mentioned, shown and played in the final episode of the Netflix Show "Pieces of Her"
 A Bösendorfer was featured being played by Dr. Evil in the 1999 film Austin Powers: The Spy Who Shagged Me
 A Bösendorfer piano featured prominently in the radio drama series The Adventures of Harry Nile episode 97, first aired on 10/05/1997, titled The Bösendorfer Matter

General bibliography 
 Fine, Larry (2007). 2007–2008 Annual Supplement to The Piano Book.
 Fine, Larry (2001). The Piano Book. Brookside Press 
 Kunz, Johannes (2002). Bösendorfer: A Living Legend. Molden Publishing Co.

Citations

External links

 
 BosendorferImperial.com – site about the Imperial pianos, the CEUS system, with complete audio files of songs, images, etc.

 
Yamaha Corporation
Manufacturing companies established in 1828
Austrian brands
Luxury brands
Piano manufacturing companies of Austria
1828 establishments in the Austrian Empire
2008 mergers and acquisitions
Purveyors to the Imperial and Royal Court
Piano manufacturing companies